New Jersey's 24th Legislative District is one of 40 in the New Jersey Legislature. As of the 2011 apportionment, the district includes the Morris County municipality of Mount Olive Township; the Sussex County municipalities of Andover Borough, Andover Township, Branchville, Byram Township, Frankford Township, Franklin, Fredon Township, Green Township, Hamburg, Hampton Township, Hardyston Township, Hopatcong, Lafayette Township, Montague Township, Newton Town, Ogdensburg, Sandyston Township, Sparta Township, Stanhope, Stillwater Township, Sussex, Vernon Township, Walpack Township and Wantage Township; and the Warren County municipalities of Allamuchy Township, Belvidere Town, Blairstown Township, Frelinghuysen Township, Hardwick Township, Hope Township, Independence Township, Knowlton Township, Liberty Township, Oxford Township and White Township.

Demographic characteristics
As of the 2020 United States census the district had a population of 210,381, of whom 169,605 (80.6%) were of voting age. The racial makeup of the district was 173,788 (82.6%) White, 5,752 (2.7%) African American, 489 (0.2%) Native American, 6,651 (3.2%) Asian, 30 (0.0%) Pacific Islander, 6,617 (3.1%) from some other race, and 17,054 (8.1%) from two or more races. Hispanic or Latino of any race were 21,356 (10.2%) of the population. 

The 24th District had 172,764 registered voters as of December 1, 2021, of whom 59,069 (34.2%) were registered as unaffiliated, 70,648 (40.9%) were registered as Republicans, 40,518 (23.5%) were registered as Democrats, and 2,529 (1.5%) were registered to other parties.

As of 2000, the district had the fourth-smallest population of any in the state and the third highest land area, making it one of the least densely populated districts in the state. The district has an extremely small minority population, with comparatively few African American (at 1.3%, the state's second lowest), Asian and Hispanic residents, and has the smallest percentage of residents age 65 and over (8.9%). Registered Republicans outnumber Democrats by a better than 3-1 margin and the district has the highest percentage of registered Republicans and the lowest percentage of Democrats.

Political representation
For the 2022–2023 session, the district is represented in the State Senate by Steve Oroho (R, Franklin) and in the General Assembly by Parker Space (R, Wantage Township) and Hal Wirths (R, Hamburg).

The legislative district overlaps with New Jersey's 5th and 7th congressional districts.

Apportionment history
Upon the creation of the 40-district legislative map in 1973, the 24th District from this point until 1981 was a narrow district running from New Providence and Summit in Union County, through eastern Morris County, into north-central Passaic County including Pompton Lakes, Bloomingdale, and Wanaque. After the 1981 redistricting, the district shape took on boundaries similar to its present limits. It included all of Sussex County except Stanhope, and all of Warren County except Franklin Township, Greenwich Township, and the Borough and Township of Washington. In the 1990s, the 24th consisted of all of Sussex County, western Morris County, and northern Hunterdon County (all municipalities in Warren County were removed). Hunterdon County's Lebanon Township, Hampton, Glen Gardner, and High Bridge were shifted to the 23rd District in the 2001 redistricting leaving only Califon and Tewksbury Township as Hunterdon County's portion of the 24th District; no other changes were made in this redistricting.

When the 1981 redistricting occurred following the results of the 1980 United States Census, State Senator James P. Vreeland and Assembly members Dean Gallo and Leanna Brown were shifted to the 26th Legislative District, with all three winning re-election in their new district. Meanwhile, the old 15th Legislative District essentially became the new 24th District.

In the face of difficulties recovering from a stroke he had suffered in October 1988, Wayne Dumont had been in deteriorating health and stepped down from the Senate in July 1990. Assemblyman Robert Littell was chosen by a special convention of Republican committee members from Sussex and Warren Counties to fill Dumont's vacancy in the Senate. In turn, Scott Garrett was chosen to fill Littell's vacant seat in the Assembly.

Robert Littell chose not to run for re-election in 2007 and by the time he had left office in 2008 had become the longest-serving legislator in New Jersey history, having served a total of 40 years in office. When his daughter Alison Littell McHose took office in the Assembly in 2004, they became the legislature's first father-daughter combination to serve simultaneously in the legislature.

Parker Space took office in March 2013, filling the seat vacated by Gary R. Chiusano, who had been chosen to fill a vacancy as Sussex County Surrogate. On October 17, 2015, Littell McHose resigned her seat to work full-time at her position as Franklin Borough's administrator. Sussex County Freeholder Gail Phoebus who had been chosen in the June 2015 primary election to run and was elected in the November general election was appointed to the seat and sworn in late in the legislative term on December 3.

Changes made as part of the New Jersey Legislative apportionment in 2011 added Allamuchy Township, Belvidere Town, Blairstown Township, Frelinghuysen Township, Hardwick Township, Hope Township, Independence Township, Knowlton Township, Liberty Township, Oxford Township and White Township (all from District 23). Removed were Califon and Tewksbury Township (to District 23); and Chester Borough, Chester Township, Netcong and Washington Township (Morris) (all to District 25).

Election history

Election results

Senate

General Assembly

References

Morris County, New Jersey
Sussex County, New Jersey
Warren County, New Jersey
24